The Medusa Touch is a 1973 novel by Peter Van Greenaway, which was adapted  into a feature film in 1978.

The novel tells the story of a novelist, John Morlar, who either has psychokinesis or clairvoyance.

The Medusa Touch is one of several Van Greenaway books featuring the character Inspector Cherry of Scotland Yard.

The 1978 movie version starred actor Richard Burton as Morlar.

References

1973 British novels
British thriller novels
British novels adapted into films
Novels about writers
Victor Gollancz Ltd books